Rekha Sharma is the current Chairperson of the National Commission for Women in India.


Career 
Sharma (b c. 1964) graduated from DAV College Dehradun, Uttarakhand, with a degree in Political Science, History and English Literature, and also holds a diploma in Marketing and Advertising. Prior to her appointment to the National Commission for Women (NCW) in August 2015, she was the BJP district secretary and media in-charge in Haryana, and a Member of the District Consumer & Redressal Forum in the Government of Haryana.

As NCW Chairperson, Sharma has been a vocal supporter of the rights of women and BJP party who have experienced sexual abuse and rape. She controversially called for the practice of confession in churches to be abolished, after allegations of abuse and blackmail of women who had made confessions. She registered a case of sexual misconduct against a Kerala state Communist Party of India Member of the Legislative Assembly, when the state government said that it was a party matter, and the Kerala Women's Commission said that it could not take action, and urged women to file complaints of sexual harassment with the NCW. 

As both a member and chairperson of the NCW, Sharma has visited and inspected psychiatric institutions, prisons, and custodial homes, and advocated for improvements to the conditions of women prisoners. She investigates claims of deprivation of women's rights and liberty, and has pursued concerns of Indian women deserted by their NRI husbands living abroad, including issues related to child custody, and of women workers in tea gardens that had been closed.
She encourages women to enter politics, but has expressed concerns about a proposed quota system.

Sharma has chaired Mahila Jan Sunwais/ Public Hearings across the country, hearing many complaints and directing police to take action. Sharma supports training and sensitisations programs for police, and also investigates complaints against police. She has also sought powers to penalise police who do not attend NCW investigations. Married to an Army Officer, she has promoted family welfare programs for spouses and children of army officers.

References 

Indian women's rights activists
Living people
Year of birth missing (living people)
Bharatiya Janata Party politicians from Uttarakhand